Centro Comercial Aricanduva, also known as Shopping Aricanduva, is the third largest shopping mall in Latin America behind the Albrook Mall in Panama, and Antea LifeStyle Center in Mexico, and one of the largest in the world. It has over 500 shops, 14 cinemas and 14,700 parking spaces. The mall is located in the Aricanduva Avenue, district of Cidade Líder, São Paulo. Its slogan is "Gigante como São Paulo", which means "Gigantic like São Paulo."

The mall is a complex that consists of Shopping Leste Aricanduva, Interlar Aricanduva (home decoration and construction stores) and Auto Shopping Aricanduva (automotive stores).

Stores
There are three hypermarkets in the mall (Extra, Walmart and Makro), two building materials stores (C&C and Dicico), fourteen cinemas, a bowling alley, two amusement parks (Playland and Plasma Park), three food courts, thirteen car dealerships.

References

Shopping malls established in 1991
Shopping malls in São Paulo